Robert D. Smith may refer to:
 Bobby Smith (ice hockey) (born 1958), Canadian ice hockey forward
 Robert Dean Smith (born 1956), American operatic tenor